Conquest is the thirteenth studio album by English rock band Uriah Heep, released in 1980. It was released worldwide by Bronze Records; however, the album was never released in North America, where it was difficult to find even as an import.

1979-80 was a period of change for Heep, with John Sloman taking over lead vocal duties, Lee Kerslake bowing out from behind the drumstool, and main songwriter Ken Hensley ultimately leaving the band. Taken together with the commercial rock sound of the album, this is the most contentious era of Uriah Heep's history, with many fans believing Conquest is the group's worst record. Despite this era being regarded in hindsight as something of a disaster by Hensley as well as Mick Box, the album did receive some positive reviews at the time, namely a five-star rating from Record Mirror and three-and-a-half stars from Geoff Barton in Sounds. It also sold well enough to crack the Top 40 of the UK album charts, whereas all three of the band's previous records with John Lawton had failed to chart in the UK at all.

The original UK release came in a single, matte LP sleeve, stickered with 'Special 10th Anniversary Price £3.99', with the liner being heavy-stock card, complete with lyrics. It credits Trevor Bolder with vocals on "It Ain't Easy" but it is, in fact, Sloman. The cover photograph, taken by Martin Poole, is based on the famous image of the raising of the second flag at Iwo Jima.

"Think It Over" was released as a picture sleeve single to promote the new line-up and tour of late 1980 and features Gregg Dechert on keyboards. Originally "Been Hurt" was written for a fourth John Lawton-fronted album. This song was shelved after Lawton's departure. The original version with Lawton on vocals has been released on the remastered version of the Fallen Angel album. When Conquest was re-issued again as a Deluxe Edition in 2004 the bonus tracks remained much the same, but "My Joanna Needs Tuning" was dropped; added in its stead was a version of "Feelings" that had previously only ever appeared on a Bronze Records promotional VHS tape.

Track listings

Personnel
Uriah Heep
 Mick Box – guitars
 Ken Hensley – obx, vocoder, organ, piano, guitars, backing vocals
 Trevor Bolder – bass guitar, backing vocals, lead vocals on "It Ain't Easy"
 John Sloman – lead vocals, backing vocals, piano, percussion
 Chris Slade – staccato drums, percussion

Additional musicians
 Gerry Bron – timpani on "Out on the Streets"
 Gregg Dechert – keyboards on "Love Stealer," "Think It Over," and "My Joanna Needs Tuning (Inside Out)"

Production
 John Gallen – producer, engineer
 Julian Cooper, Darren Burn, David Kemp, Nick Rogers – assistant engineers
 Martin Poole – sleeve design, photography
 Karl Bosley, Lindy Curry – sleeve design
 Gerry Bron – executive producer

Charts

References

1980 albums
Uriah Heep (band) albums
Albums produced by Gerry Bron
Bronze Records albums